The Donald O'Connor Show (also known as Here Comes Donald) is an American musical situation comedy television series starring singer/dancer Donald O'Connor.  It appeared on NBC from October 9, 1954, to September 10, 1955, alternating on the Saturday evening schedule with The Jimmy Durante Show; both were sponsored by Texaco.

Synopsis
O'Connor, the son of circus performers and formerly an alternating host on The Colgate Comedy Hour, and his co-director and co-star Sidney Miller portray young struggling songwriters trying to find buyers for their musical compositions. This scenario allows the two to break out in song and dance throughout the program.  In the segment which aired on December 4, 1954, three daughters of a theater owner have a dream about O'Connor the dancer: he is viewed as a marshal in the American West, as a knight in the Middle Ages, or as a famous composer such as Beethoven, Chopin, or Arthur Sullivan.

Joyce Cunning, also known also as Joyce Smight, co-starred in the series in the role of Doreen, the songwriters' secretary. Other regulars were Regina Gleason, Joyce Holden, Jan Orvan, Olan Soule, and the Al Goodman Orchestra. Most musical programs at the time were shown live or on Kinescope. However, The Donald O'Connor Show was shot on film.

Guest stars included the dancer Sharon Baird, singer Mitzi Gaynor, singer and musical composer Johnny Mercer, eight-year-old Tim Rooney (son of Mickey Rooney), then eleven-year-old Harry Shearer, Boris Karloff, Reginald Denny, and Douglas Fowley. The Robert Mitchell Boys Choir appeared with O'Connor and Miller on the Christmas night 1954 episode.
O'Connor had all episodes stored in case he wanted to have them syndicated, but his production company, O'Connor Television, may have lost the rights to NBC, who refused syndication; O'Connor Television lost profits resulting in termination and "lost" episodes.

In 1964, nine years after the original The Donald O'Connor Show had folded, Lucille Ball tried in vain to revive the idea of another The Donald O'Connor Show script to ABC after it was rejected by NBC and CBS. That year her own The Lucy Show was the only Desilu Production on the networks.

O'Connor instead returned to television in the mid-1960s to host The Bell Telephone Hour; one of his episodes focuses on Cole Porter. In the 1968-1969 season, O'Connor hosted a syndicated talk show, also called The Donald O'Connor Show. The show was picked up by NBC. This second series had Joyce Jameson as the announcer and the accompaniment of the Alan Copland Orchestra. Numerous well-known guest stars, such as
Joan Baez, Sterling Holloway, Meredith MacRae, Barrie Chase, Irwin Corey, Peter Breck, Mike Minor, Dana Wynter, and musicians Ike and Tina Turner. The programs aired unspecified episodes between November 18, 1968, and August 4, 1969, though it may have begun some weeks earlier than indicated.

O'Connor was reprimanded by NBC; the show was cancelled on account of O'Connor managing to offend many of his guests, including Joan Baez, by bluntly asking "How did you like it up river?" regarding her prison sentence for war protests. He additionally offended Irwin Corey after Corey brought up his left-wing political views,"I wonder if you'll get blacklisted again. I don't think you've learned your lesson yet. We live in a republic, Mr. Corey." The cancellation had no effect on O'Connor who said, "the show was great practice and now I'm ready to get that job in politics that I've always wanted."

The talk show ended with only five episodes made in the span of the two years.
SME (Sony Music Entertainment) is said to have bought the show rights from NBC though SME has been accused of false copyright claims since the 1930s. Warner Bros. have made attempts to abscond with musical compositions written by O'Connor heard on Here Comes Donald and The Donald O'Connor Show, also including "I Wanna Wonder" from I Love Melvin and the orchestral music from the "Make 'Em Laugh" sequence in Singing in the Rain. Orchard Enterprises, a wholly owned subsidiary of SME distributed, without authorization from its parent organization, to YouTube seven Here Comes Donald songs on November 20, 2014. These can be found on the still-active fan-run Donald O'Connor-Topic YouTube channel. SME now has in place copyright claims on many movies and TV shows with the name Donald O'Connor in the title, continuing to effectively ban the full versions on YouTube.

References

1954 American television series debuts
1955 American television series endings
1950s American sitcoms
1950s American variety television series
NBC original programming
Black-and-white American television shows
English-language television shows
Television shows set in Los Angeles